Allen A. McCauley (March 4, 1863– August 24, 1917), was an American first baseman and pitcher in Major League Baseball for three seasons, 1884, 1890 and 1891. He played in the minor leagues between 1884 and 1890 and afterwards from 1892–1897, primarily in the Western League.

External links

1863 births
1917 deaths
Major League Baseball pitchers
Baseball players from Indiana
19th-century baseball players
Indianapolis Hoosiers (AA) players
Philadelphia Phillies players
Washington Statesmen players
Portsmouth Riversides players
Bridgeport Giants players
St. Paul Saints (Northwestern League) players
Davenport Onion Weeders players
Peoria Canaries players
Omaha Lambs players
Los Angeles Seraphs players
Los Angeles Angels (minor league) players
Minneapolis Millers (baseball) players
Sioux City Cornhuskers players
Detroit Tigers (Western League) players
Grand Rapids Gold Bugs players
Milwaukee Brewers (minor league) players
Jackson Wolverines players
Rockford Forest Citys (minor league) players